Good Old Broadway is an album by saxophonist Coleman Hawkins which was recorded in 1962 and released on the Moodsville label.

Reception

Allmusic awarded the album 3 stars.

Track listing 
 "I Talk to the Trees" (Alan Jay Lerner, Frederick Loewe) - 4:23  
 "Smoke Gets in Your Eyes" (Otto Harbach, Jerome Kern) - 4:40  
 "Wanting You" (Oscar Hammerstein II, Sigmund Romberg) - 2:26  
 "Strange Music" (George Forrest, Robert Wright, Edvard Grieg) - 6:17  
 "The Man That Got Away" (Harold Arlen, Ira Gershwin) - 4:08  
 "Get Out of Town" (Cole Porter) - 4:14  
 "Here I'll Stay" (Alan Jay Lerner, Kurt Weill) - 4:08  
 "A Fellow Needs a Girl" (Hammerstein, Richard Rodgers) - 4:47

Personnel 
Coleman Hawkins - tenor saxophone
Tommy Flanagan - piano
Major Holley - bass
Eddie Locke - drums

References 

Coleman Hawkins albums
1962 albums
Moodsville Records albums
Albums recorded at Van Gelder Studio
Albums produced by Esmond Edwards